Jaakko Veikko Emanuel Pöyry (August 6, 1924 in Sodankylä – September 8, 2006 in Helsinki) was a Finnish industrialist.

He founded Pöyry (OMX: POY1V) and personally oversaw its growth from a small engineering office to a global consulting and engineering firm focusing on the energy, forest industry and infrastructure and environment sectors. It changed its name from Jaakko Pöyry Group in 2006. The company is headquartered in Vantaa, Finland.

Sources

External links
 Poyry

20th-century Finnish businesspeople
People from Sodankylä
1924 births
2006 deaths